Stand Up and Be Counted is a 1972 American comedy film directed by Jackie Cooper and starring Jacqueline Bisset and Stella Stevens. It features the recording of "I Am Woman" (1971) by Helen Reddy.

Plot

Cast 
 Jacqueline Bisset - Sheila Hammond
 Stella Stevens - Yvonne Kellerman
 Steve Lawrence - Gary McBride
 Gary Lockwood - Eliot Travis
 Lee Purcell - Karen Hammond
 Loretta Swit - Hilary McBride
 Héctor Elizondo - Lou Kellerman
 Anne Francine - Mabel Hammond
 Madlyn Rhue - Gloria Seagar
 Alex Wilson - Jerry Kamanski
 Michael Ansara - Playboy Speaker
 Joyce Brothers - Herself 
 Jessica Rains - Sadie
 Meredith Baxter - Tracy

See also
 List of American films of 1972

External links

https://www.rottentomatoes.com/m/stand_up_and_be_counted
https://letterboxd.com/film/stand-up-and-be-counted/

1972 films
1972 comedy films
American comedy films
Columbia Pictures films
1970s feminist films
Films about journalists
Films set in 1971
Films set in Colorado
Films shot in Colorado
Films directed by Jackie Cooper
1972 directorial debut films
1970s English-language films
1970s American films